Brigati is a surname. Notable people with the surname include:

David Brigati (born 1940), American singer
Eddie Brigati (born 1945), American singer and songwriter

See also
Brigatinib